The Legion of Frontiersmen is a civilian organisation formed in Britain in 1905 by Roger Pocock, a former constable with the North-West Mounted Police and Boer War veteran. Prompted by fears of an impending invasion of Britain and the Empire, the organisation was founded to be a field intelligence corps that would watch over and protect the boundaries of the Empire. Headquartered in London, the Legion of Frontiersmen formed branches throughout the Empire to prepare enlistees for war and to foster vigilance in peacetime. Despite efforts, the Legion never achieved significant official recognition; in part because many Commonwealth nations' laws prohibit militia groups.

Casualties in the First World War devastated the Legion of Frontiersmen, and except for a brief resurgence in the interwar period, a series of schisms and sectarianism prevented attempts to reinvigorate the movement. In the late 1930s, the Legion of Frontiersmen in Canada was formally affiliated with the Royal Canadian Mounted Police, but after a schism split within the Canadian Frontiersmen, the RCMP severed formal ties. Various Legion of Frontiersmen groups still exist throughout the Commonwealth, but as a whole, it has been unable to define its niche post World War II; especially because the organisation generally refuses to provide information about its activities to prospective applicants.

First World War 

During the First World War, the Legion of Frontiersmen helped raise and fill the ranks of the Princess Patricia's Canadian Light Infantry, the 19th Alberta Dragoons, the 49th Battalion - Canadian Expeditionary Force (today's Loyal Edmonton Regiment), the 210th Battalion (Frontiersmen), - Canadian Expeditionary Force, the 25th (Frontiersmen) Battalion, Royal Fusiliers, and the Newfoundland Regiment.  Despite the nature of the organisation, many of its members had no military experience and were probably no better (or worse) than other recruits to other wartime raised units.

Uniforms 

The earliest official description of an authorized uniform for a Canadian unit is noted in The Frontiersman,
(December 1912, page 223) describing Vernon and Okanagan Command’s uniform as follows:
“Shirt Tunic – To be of substantial material, colour navy blue; leather buttons; nickel shoulder chains. Breeches or (Trousers) – Any shade of khaki.
Footwear – Brown leather; any combination that affords cover as high as the calves.
Headdress – Straight brim Stetson, any shade of brown, with leather band and regimental crest and monogram.
Accessories – Brown leather fringed gauntlets; silk blue and white “bird’s-eye” neckerchief; regulation LF holster.”

Decorations 
Branches of the legion, in different parts of the Commonwealth award medals within their units and occasionally to external branches, commands, or units. The Australian Division awards a decoration called the "Australian Medal of Merit" and within the organisation has used the post nominal letters AMM. On occasion, such medal names and use of post nominal letters has caused controversy.

Members 
Patrick William Forbes
William Le Queux
Basil Lubbock
Roger Pocock
Ethel Pritchard
Charles G. D. Roberts
John Shiwak
Francis Morphet Twisleton
Arthur Owen Vaughan

Sources 
 Christopher M. Andrew, Secret Service: The Making of the British Intelligence Community. London: Trafalgar Square, 1985. 
Robert H. MacDonald, Sons of the Empire: The Frontier and the Boy Scout Movement, 1890–1918. Toronto: University of Toronto Press, 1993. 
John Fisher. Gentleman Spies: intelligence agents in the British Empire and beyond. Stroud, UK: Sutton, 2002. 
Geoffrey A. Pocock. One Hundred Years of the Legion of Frontiersmen. Chichester, UK: Phillimore, 2004.

References

External links

 History of the Frontiersmen
 Australian Division
 New Zealand Command
 NZ Command Pro Patria
 Scottish Command 1st Highland Brigade LOF Vols (Yeomanry)
 Countess Mountbatten's Own
 3e Régiment de Lanciers 
 Canadian Corps of Frontiersmen
 Far East Command

1905 establishments in the United Kingdom
Civil defence organisations based in the United Kingdom
Civil–military relations
Mutual organizations
Political organisations based in the United Kingdom
Paramilitary organisations based in the United Kingdom
Patriotic societies